Mount Billing is a wedge-shaped mountain,  high, standing between Mount Mallis and Mount Bowen in the Prince Albert Mountains, Victoria Land. It was named by the New Zealand Antarctic Place-Names Committee for Graham Billing, public relations officer at Scott Base, 1962–63 and 1963–64 seasons.

References
 

Prince Albert Mountains
Mountains of Victoria Land
Scott Coast